Olivia Lillian Deeble (born 4 August 2002) is an Australian actress and writer. She is known for her roles in the ABC Me series Little Lunch (2015–2016), the Seven Network soap opera Home and Away (2016–2019), and the Disney+ film Secret Society of Second-Born Royals (2020). She co-created and starred in the Paramount+ drama More Than This (2022).

Early life
Deeble is from Balwyn, Victoria, a suburb of Melbourne. She is the daughter of actress Kate Gorman, and the granddaughter of actors Reg Gorman and Judith Roberts. She moved in with her grandparents in Sydney when she won her role on Home and Away, visiting home twice a month. She has a sister, Matilda, and a brother, Ewan.

Career
Deeble's first major television role was Tamara Noodle in the children's mockumentary comedy Little Lunch. A year and a half later, she landed the role of Raffy Morrison on Home and Away, starring in over 200 episodes of the soap. On 10 May 2019, Jonathon Moran of The Daily Telegraph reported that Deeble had finished up filming with the show. Her final scenes aired on 12 September 2019. Deeble plays Princess Roxana in the Disney+ film Secret Society of Second-Born Royals. Production took place in May 2019 in Toronto.

In 2022, Deeble will appear in the six-part drama series More Than This on Paramount+, which she wrote and co-created with Luka Gracie. The coming-of-age drama centres on five students and their teacher, played by Bert Labonte. The series is produced by Deeble's aunt Charmaine Gorman and mother Kate Gorman, who also co-directed the episodes with John Sheedy. Deeble worked on the show during the COVID-19 lockdown while she completed Year 12.

Filmography

Film

Television

Awards and nominations

References

External links
 

2002 births
Living people
21st-century Australian actresses
Actresses from Melbourne
Australian child actresses
People from Balwyn, Victoria